The Feldkirchner Badeseen are a group of five lakes in the municipality of Feldkirchen an der Donau, Upper Austria.

Lakes of Upper Austria